Honorary titles of Ukraine are meritorious awards of Ukraine. Most of them are state awards and practically all were transformed from the same titles of the Ukrainian SSR.

Types
There are several degrees for honorary titles which are also designated for various carrier (industry) fields.

The top honorary title of Ukraine is the Hero of Ukraine that is accompanied by either Order of the Gold Star for military recognition and Order of the State for civilian recognition.

The more common honorary titles are People's or Merited with People's titles being considered of slightly higher tier over Merited. These titles are accompanied by a respective identification badge, gilded silver - for People's titles and silver - for Merited titles. Along with them there are some top sport titles that are also considered Merited, but are regulated differently.

Aside the above-mentioned titles there are number of other titles such as the Mother-Heroine which particularly is an equally respected along with honorary titles. The accompanied badge for the Mother-Heroine title is made of brass. Another honorary title is the President of Ukraine that stays with its holder for the rest of one's life. Honorary titles are also created in number of companies and organizations as well as city administrations among which are honorary presidents, honorary citizens and others.

Since the 2022 Russian full scale invasion of Ukraine, there was introduced the Soviet-type award granted to cities, defenders of which distinguished themselves in fight against military aggression. Previously in the Soviet Union a similar award was granted to cities in the aftermath of World War II.

Hero titles
 Hero of Ukraine
 Mother-Heroine (Ukraine)
 Hero City of Ukraine

People's titles
 People's Artist of Ukraine
 People's Architect of Ukraine
 People's Teacher of Ukraine
 People's Painter of Ukraine

Merited titles
These titles have also been translated as "Honored" rather than "Merited". However, since Order of Merit is awarded for highest merits (zasluhy), honorary titles are translated as Merited (zasluzhenyi).

 Merited Artist of Ukraine
 Merited Architect of Ukraine
 Merited Builder of Ukraine
 Merited Inventor of Ukraine
 Merited Teacher of Ukraine
 Merited Mining Engineer of Ukraine
 Merited Arts Functionary of Ukraine
 Merited Science and Technology Functionary of Ukraine
 Merited Donor of Ukraine
 Merited Economist of Ukraine
 Merited Power Engineer of Ukraine
 Merited Journalist of Ukraine
 Merited Doctor of Ukraine
 Merited Forester of Ukraine
 Merited Master of Folk Arts of Ukraine
 Merited Machine Builder of Ukraine
 Merited Metallurgist of Ukraine
 Merited Metrologist of Ukraine
 Merited Worker of Veterinary Medicine of Ukraine
 Merited Culture Worker of Ukraine
 Merited Education Worker of Ukraine
 Merited Healthcare Worker of Ukraine
 Merited Industry Worker of Ukraine
 Merited Transportation Worker of Ukraine
 Merited Tourism Worker of Ukraine
 Merited Agriculture Worker of Ukraine
 Merited Social Worker of Ukraine
 Merited Service Sector Worker of Ukraine
 Merited Pharmacy Worker of Ukraine
 Merited Worker of Physical Culture and Sports of Ukraine
 Merited Civil Defense Worker of Ukraine
 Merited Environmentalist of Ukraine
 Merited Rationalizer of Ukraine
 Merited Painter of Ukraine
 Merited Miner of Ukraine
 Merited Jurist of Ukraine

Sports titles
 Merited Coach of Ukraine
 Merited Master of Sports of Ukraine
 Master of Sports of Ukraine, World Class (type of sports) / Grandmaster of Ukraine
 Master of Sports of Ukraine (type of sports)

Other titles
 Guard, elite military formations and Naval ships
 Academic, to theaters of drama or music
 National (National Opera of Ukraine, Olimpiysky National Sports Complex, National Space Agency of Ukraine, National Academy of Sciences of Ukraine, others)

Discontinued titles
There are many titles that were discontinued among which are the Exemplary titles, Distinguished titles (Distinguished Corn Producer of Ukraine, Distinguished Agricultural Machine Operator of Ukraine and others).

 Honorary Firefighter-Volunteer of Ukraine

External links
 Provisions on honorary titles of Ukraine. Ukase of the President of Ukraine. Official document.
 Honorary titles. Great Soviet Encyclopedia.
 Forum on distinctions of the Ukrainian SSR. Collectors forum "Sammler.ru".